Heed the Call is the 25th studio album by Christian music group The Imperials, released in 1979 on DaySpring Records. The group won their third Grammy Award for Best Gospel Performance, Contemporary or Inspirational for their album Heed the Call at the 22nd Grammy Awards and were named Male Group of the Year at the 11th GMA Dove Awards. The track "Praise the Lord" won Song of the Year the following year given to its writers Brown Bannister and Mike Hudson at the 12th GMA Dove Awards. The Imperials were the first group to have a number-one song ("Oh Buddha") on all three of the following charts: Contemporary, Inspirational and Southern gospel. Heed the Call debuted and peaked at number 3 on Billboard magazine's inaugural Top Inspirational Albums chart on March 29, 1980.

Track listing

Personnel

The Imperials
 Russ Taff – lead vocals
 Jim Murray – tenor, vocals
 David Will – baritone, vocals
 Armond Morales – bass, vocals

Charts

Radio singles

Accolades
Grammy Awards

GMA Dove Awards
1980 Male Group of the Year

References

1979 albums
The Imperials albums
Word Records albums